The 2008 Gloucester City Council election took place on 1 May 2008 to elect members of Gloucester City Council in England. Twelve of the 36 seats on the council were up for election, ten of which were the usual nominal third of the council. The other two were by-elections, being one in Barnwood ward (following the resignation of Phil Taylor of the Liberal Democrats) and the other in Barton and Tredworth ward (following the resignation of Carol Francis of Labour). The council remained under no overall control. Paul James continued to serve as leader of the council after the election, leading a minority Conservative administration.

Results  

|}

Ward results

Abbey

Barnwood

Barton and Tredworth

Elmbridge

Grange

Hucclecote

Longlevens

Matson and Robinswood

Moreland

Tuffley

References

2008 English local elections
2008
2000s in Gloucestershire